The Third Hellenic Republic is the period in modern Greek history that stretches from 1974, with the fall of the Greek military junta and the final confirmation of the abolishment of the Greek monarchy, to the present day.

It is considered the third period of republican rule in Greece, following the First Republic during the Greek War of Independence (1821–1832) and the Second Republic during the temporary abolition of the monarchy in 1924–1935.

The term "Metapolitefsi" (Μεταπολίτευση, 'polity change') is commonly used for the entire period, but when used more strictly, this term refers to the early part of the period, beginning with the fall of the junta and culminating in the democratic transformation of the country. While the First and Second Hellenic Republics are not in common use except in a historiographic context, the term Third Hellenic Republic is used frequently.

The Third Hellenic Republic has been characterised by the development of social freedoms, the European orientation of Greece and the political dominance of the parties ND and PASOK. On the negative side the period has included high corruption, deterioration of certain economic indexes such as public debt, and nepotism, mostly in the political scene and the state offices.

Events

This period has been marked by many significant changes in the country. In 1981 Greece joined the EU. Simultaneously, the centre-left party PASOK won the election and changed the Greek political scenery.  The decade of the 1990s saw the standard of living among Greeks steadily increase, a trend which reached its zenith around the time of the Olympic Games of 2004. On 1 January 2001, Greece voted to adopt the Euro, and the currency was introduced in the country one year later on 1 January 2002. In the last months of 2009, the Greek debt crisis broke out, an event that brought about great changes on both a social and political level. The COVID-19 pandemic caused more economic hardship for Greece.

Presidents of the Third Hellenic Republic

Michail Stasinopoulos (1974–1975)
Konstantinos Tsatsos (1975–1980)
Konstantinos Karamanlis (1980–1985)
Christos Sartzetakis (1985–1990)
Konstantinos Karamanlis (1990–1995)
Konstantinos Stephanopoulos (1995–2005)
Karolos Papoulias (2005–2015)
Prokopis Pavlopoulos (2015–2020)
Katerina Sakellaropoulou (2020–present)

Political parties in Third Hellenic Republic

1974–1989
This period began with the centrists and centre-right being dominant, though the former lost support in the late 1970s with the rise of the Panhellenic Socialist Movement. Also the Communist Party of Greece was allowed to take part in elections for first time after the end of the Greek Civil War. The table below shows the results of elections during this period.

1990–2007
This period began with the fall of communist regimes in eastern Europe. It is characterized by the reinforcement of bipartisanship with the two main parties (New Democracy and PASOK) regularly polling over 80% of the vote between them, even reaching 86%.

2009–2019
This period corresponds to Greek government-debt crisis, that changed dramatically the political stage. Early in the period, PASOK were able to capitalise on a loss of support for ND.  However, by the early 2010s, PASOK were also attracting blame for their handling of the crisis, and the radical party SYRIZA became the largest party on the left. The position of the far-right was also strengthened in this period.

SYRIZA has since overtaken PASOK as the main party of the centre-left.Alexis Tsipras led SYRIZA to victory in the general election held on 25 January 2015, falling short of an outright majority in Parliament by just two seats. The following morning, Tsipras reached an agreement with Independent Greeks party to form a coalition, and he was sworn in as Prime Minister of Greece. Tsipras called snap elections in August 2015, resigning from his post, which led to a month-long caretaker administration headed by judge Vassiliki Thanou-Christophilou, Greece's first female prime minister. In the September 2015 general election, Alexis Tsipras led SYRIZA to another victory, winning 145 out of 300 seats  and re-forming the coalition with the Independent Greeks. However, he was defeated in the July 2019 general election by Kyriakos Mitsotakis who leads New Democracy. On 7 July 2019, Kyriakos Mitsotakis was sworn in as the new Prime Minister of Greece. He formed a centre-right government after the landslide victory of his New Democracy party.

2020s
In March 2020, Greece's parliament elected a non-partisan candidate, Ekaterini Sakellaropoulou, as the first female President of Greece.

Notes

References

 
Political history of Greece
1974 in Greece
States and territories established in 1974
1974 establishments in Greece
1970s in Greek politics
Konstantinos Karamanlis